İkinci Yalama (also, Ikindzhi-Yalama, Rybnyy Promysel Yalama Nomer Vtoroy, Yalama Nomer Vtoroy, and Yalama Vtoraya) is a village in the Khachmaz Rayon of Azerbaijan.

References 

Populated places in Khachmaz District